Pierre Mas (1891–1970 Tangier) was a French media mogul of the francophone press in Morocco under the French Protectorate.

Biography 
On 1 January 1920 he founded  in Casablanca. The following year, through a sale of shares, he came to control  in Casablanca as well. In 1929, he founded  in Fes. He then added to these  in Tangier. This media conglomerate came to be called . He also founded .

He was put under house arrest in 1945 for his support of the Vichy regime.

References 

20th-century French businesspeople
French newspaper publishers (people)